Andrea Siodmok  (née Cooper) (born 1972) is a British industrial designer and social innovator.  She received an OBE for public service in the 2021 Queen's Birthday Honours.

Early life and education
Siodmok was born in the West Midlands, the daughter of a Military Officer in the Royal Air Force. She attended Garendon High School and Burleigh Community College in Loughborough, boarding at Field House. After this she studied art and design at the University of Wolverhampton, industrial design at Newcastle Polytechnic and public policy at The London School of Economics. Siodmok also has a PhD in Virtual Reality sponsored by BT from Northumbria University. In 2016, she received an honorary doctorate in Civil Law from Northumbria University, in 'Recognition of her status as one of the UK's foremost design thinkers'.

Career
On graduating, Siodmok was invited to join the faculty teaching industrial design and transportation design. As an academic, she taught design practice and theory while also undertaking a PhD in Virtual Reality at the Human Factors department of BT's Adastral Park. Siodmok's PhD research documented in detail a design approach to the development of virtual reality projects undertaken at the futures lab of BT and in design consultancy. Here she ran industry projects, including a 'special project' with Jony Ive whilst he was at Apple Computers. 

From 1994 onwards, Siodmok worked as an industrial designer at Octo Design in Newcastle, with some of her earliest consultancy work being designing the then world's smallest x-ray machine (by Bede Scientific for NASA) as well as medical instruments and a range of consumer products. However, after designing hundreds of shapes for air fresheners, she became increasingly disillusioned with the superficiality of product design and wanted to apply design to more socially deserving causes. Inspired by E. F. Schumacher's 'Small is Beautiful', Papanek's 'Design for the Real World' and Nigel Whiteley's 'Design for Society', over the next decade Siodmok set out to explore the boundaries of design practice applying design for social good, service design, sustainability and establishing the nascent field of policy design.

In 2002 Siodmok joined the UK Design Council, becoming their first Chief Design Officer. Here she was an early proponent of service design, championing greater public involvement in designing public services. At the Design Council she was part of the small design strategy team behind the 'Double Diamond' process and design "methodbank".

In 2009 Siodmok left the Design Council and became the Programme Director of 'Designs of the Time' social innovation biennale after Dott07 by John Thackara. The design programme concluded with a nine-week-long celebration of design across the region, which was Cornwall's first Cornwall Design Festival. Following this, Siodmok became Chief Designer for service design and innovation for Cornwall Council.

In 2014 Siodmok founded the UK Government's first Policy Lab to open up policy-making and bring new digital, data science and design methods to 20,000 policy-makers across the UK Government, with a report from government noting at the time: "if there's one set of skills departments lack it's not policymaking, it's designing".
In 2015 she was a recipient of the Royal Society of Arts Bicentenary Medal awarded to individuals for their outstanding contributions to the advancement of design in industry and society. 

Siodmok has authored various chapters about policy design and been published in the Royal Society of Arts Journal.

In 2022 she became Chief Impact Officer at the Royal Society of Arts, Manufactures and Commerce (RSA). She is currently a trustee at CIPD, a member of the 1851 Royal Commission Committee, and an external examiner at the Royal College of Art.

Honours

 Siodmok was awarded an OBE in the Queen's birthday honours 2021.
 In 2016, she received an honorary doctorate in Civil Law, from Northumbria University, in 'recognition of her status as one of the UK's foremost design thinkers'.
 In 2015 Siodmok became the 10th female in its history to receive the Bicentenary Medal of the Royal Society of Arts.
 Winner, Cabinet Office Awards (2015, 2017 and 2019).

References

External links
 Cambridge University Biography for Andrea Siodmok
 Royal Society of Arts Biography for Andrea Siodmok
 UK Government official page for Andrea Siodmok
 Policy Connect Biography for Andrea Siodmok

1972 births
Living people
Alumni of the University of Wolverhampton
Alumni of Northumbria University
Officers of the Order of the British Empire
Alumni of the London School of Economics